EHC Arosa is a Swiss ice hockey team.

Founded: 1924
Home arena: Obersee Stadion (capacity 7,500)
Swiss Championships won: 9 (1951–1957, 1980, 1982)
Nationalliga B Championships won: 1 (1977)

External links
 EHC Arosa official website

Ice hockey teams in Switzerland
Grisons
Arosa